Francis Kinloch may refer to:

Sir Francis Kinloch, 1st Baronet (died 1691), Scottish politician
Sir Francis Kinloch, 3rd Baronet (1676–1747), scion of a noble family
Francis Kinloch (Congressman) (1755–1826), American soldier and politician from South Carolina